Jerome Allen (1830–1894) was an American educator and author, born in Westminster, Vermont.

He graduated from Amherst College in 1851, then presided over several institutions in the Western United States from 1851 to 1885.

Books 
 Handbook of Experimental Chemistry (1876)  
 Short Studies in English (1886–7)  
 Mind Studies for Young Teachers (seventh edition, 1887)  
 Temperament of Education (1890)

References

External links
 

1830 births
1894 deaths
People from Westminster (town), Vermont
American educators
American education writers
Education school deans
Amherst College alumni